Yekaterina Khoroshikh (born 21 January 1983 in Rostov Oblast) is a female hammer thrower from Russia. Her personal best is 76.63 metres, achieved in June 2006 in Zhukovsky.

Doping ban 
Khoroshikh tested positive for 6α-methylandrostendione in May 2007 and was subsequently handed a two-year ban from sports

Achievements

See also
List of sportspeople sanctioned for doping offences

References

External links 

1983 births
Living people
Sportspeople from Rostov Oblast
Russian female hammer throwers
Doping cases in athletics
Russian sportspeople in doping cases